Patrick D. Frank is a United States Army lieutenant general who serves as the commanding general of United States Army Central since July 7, 2022. He most recently served as the Chief of Staff of the United States Central Command and before that served as the Commanding General of the Joint Readiness Training Center.

Frank earned a Bachelor of Arts degree in finance from St. Bonaventure University in 1989. He later received a Master of Public Administration degree from the Maxwell School at Syracuse University, a master's degree in national security and strategic studies from the Naval War College and a Master of Strategic Studies degree from the United States Army War College.

References

Living people
Maxwell School of Citizenship and Public Affairs alumni
Naval War College alumni
Place of birth missing (living people)
St. Bonaventure University alumni
United States Army generals
United States Army personnel of the Gulf War
United States Army personnel of the Iraq War
United States Army personnel of the War in Afghanistan (2001–2021)
United States Army War College alumni
Year of birth missing (living people)